HD 64760 (J Puppis) is a class B0.5 supergiant star in the constellation Puppis. Its apparent magnitude is 4.24 and it is approximately 1,660 light years away based on parallax.

The stellar wind structure of HD 64760 has been extensively studied. Its spectrum shows classic P Cygni profiles indicative of strong mass loss and high-velocity winds, but the spectral line profiles are also variable. The variation shows a 2.4 day modulation which is caused by non-radial pulsation of the star itself. Other pulsation periods around 4.81 hours have also been identified.

HD 64760 rotates rapidly. Despite its large size it completes a rotation every 4.1 days compared to every 27 days for the sun. This causes the star to be an oblate spheroid, with the equatorial radius 20% larger than the polar radius. It is estimated that the temperature of the photosphere is 23,300 K at the equator and 29,000 K at the poles, due to gravity darkening. In addition, the surface has temperature variations due to its pulsations.

References

Puppis
B-type supergiants
Puppis, J
CD-47 3396
038518
3090
064760